Mark and space are terms used in telecommunications to describe two different signal states of a communications signal, generally at the physical layer of a communications system. The terms derive from the early days of the electric telegraph system, where the marking state would cause a mark to be output on paper, and the spacing state would create no mark.

The terms would continue to be used in systems such as RS-232, with similar conventions, that "mark" would be encoded by a negative voltage (or current flow), and "space" by a positive voltage (or no current flow). In such systems, the line is typically left in the "mark" state when idle.

"Mark" is generally identified with the binary digit "1" and "space" with the binary digit "0".

References

See also 
 Baud
 Break key
Laws of Form
 Morse code

Telecommunication theory